Virginie Dedieu (born 25 February 1979) is a French former synchronized swimmer and Olympic medalist.

Virginie won a bronze medal in the women's duet at the 2000 Summer Olympics with Myriam Lignot. She was also successful in the European and World Aquatics Championships, winning several medals.

Dedieu was awarded the Legion of Honour on 1 January 2006.

References 

1979 births
Living people
French synchronized swimmers
Olympic bronze medalists for France
Olympic synchronized swimmers of France
Synchronized swimmers at the 1996 Summer Olympics
Synchronized swimmers at the 2000 Summer Olympics
Synchronized swimmers at the 2004 Summer Olympics
Olympic medalists in synchronized swimming
Recipients of the Legion of Honour
Sportspeople from Aix-en-Provence
Synchronized swimmers at the 2015 World Aquatics Championships
Medalists at the 2000 Summer Olympics